Higelin et Areski is the second album by French rock singer Jacques Higelin and the first credited to Areski Belkacem. Higelin and Areski met at the army, and Higelin would later introduce Areski to Brigitte Fontaine, who would become his lover and creative partner. The songs on the album are mostly minimalistic and experimental.

Track listing 

1969 albums
Jacques Higelin albums
Areski Belkacem albums